is a Shinto shrine in the Miyauchi neighborhood of the town of Yurihama in Tottori Prefecture, Japan, on the east bank of Lake Tōgō. It is the ichinomiya of former Hōki Province. The main festival of the shrine is held annually on 1 May.

Enshrined kami
The kami enshrined at Shitori Shrine are:

History
The origins of Shitori Shrine are unknown. However, the shrine's legends are all centered around Shitateruhime-no-Mikoto, whom the shrine legend claims arrived in this location from Izumo by boat. She established her residence on the mountain behind this shrine, and after her death, she was buried in a kofun constructed in the shrine's precincts.    

The earliest this shrine appears in documentary records is in the AD 808 medical text . During the Sengoku period, the shine was laid to waste, but it was reconstructed by the Amago clan and was later supported by the Ikeda clan, the daimyō of Tottori Domain. During the Meiji period era of State Shinto, the shrine was rated as a  under the modern system of ranked Shinto Shrines.

Hōki Ichinomiya Sutra Mound
Until the early 20th century, Shitateruhime-no-Mikoto was regarded as the primary deity of this shrine. However, in 1915 an archaeological excavation discovered that the purported empun-style circular burial mound was actually a sutra mound. The mound had a diameter of 16-meters and height of 1.6 meters. It contains a rectangular stone box that was 1.2 x 0.9 x 0.5 meters made of andesite flat stones. The inside was covered with coarse sand, and contained copper sutra cylinder with inscriptions. The inscription was dated 1103 and was inscribed by monk named Kyoson of the Hōki Ichinomiya. In addition to the sutra cylinder, the box contained a gilt-bronze statue of Kannon Bosatsu, an image of Miroku Bosatsu engraving on a copper plate, a bronze mirror, a cypress fan, a short sword, beads, and copper coins. The sutra mounds are valuable in considering the burial memorial service in the Heian period. The sutra mound was designated as a National Historic Site in 1935. All excavated items are stored at the Tokyo National Museum.

Location
The shrine is located a 35-minute walk from Matsuzaki Station on the JR West San'in Main Line.

Cultural Properties

National Treasures

Gallery

See also
List of Shinto shrines
List of Historic Sites of Japan (Tottori)
 List of National Treasures of Japan (archaeological materials)
Ichinomiya

References
 Plutschow, Herbe. Matsuri: The Festivals of Japan. Routledge Curzon (1996) 
 Ponsonby-Fane, Richard Arthur Brabazon. (1959).  The Imperial House of Japan. Kyoto: Ponsonby Memorial Society. OCLC 194887

External links

Official home page
Tottori Tourist Information
 Tottori prefecture Cultural properties navigation

Notes

Shinto shrines in Tottori Prefecture
Hōki Province
Yurihama, Tottori
Ichinomiya
Historic Sites of Japan
National Treasures of Japan
Beppyo shrines